Neaera is a German heavy metal band from Münster. The band was active from 2003 before breaking up in 2015. The band released seven studio albums.

Musical style 
Tobias Buck started Neaera to change the musical influence of the style he had played before with fellow Münster death metal band Malzan. The band was interested in the Swedish death metal genre, and decided to create a sound of their own, based on similar styles.

Band members 
 Current members
 Benjamin Hilleke – lead vocals
 Stefan Keller – guitar
 Tobias Buck – guitar 
 Benjamin Donath – bass
 Sebastian Heldt – drums

Discography

Studio albums

Music videos

References

External links 

 
 
 Neaera at Metal Blade Records

German melodic death metal musical groups
Musical groups established in 2003
Musical quintets
Metal Blade Records artists